The Park Hyatt Toronto is a historic hotel that opened in 1936 as the  Park Plaza Hotel. It is located in the Annex area of Toronto, Ontario, Canada.

History

The site
The hotel is located at the northwestern corner of Bloor Street and Avenue Road. The first known building on the site was a small wayside inn built in 1820 and named Tecumseh Wigwam. Then a considerable distance from the city, it served travellers on their way north out of town. The inn was demolished around 1875.

Park Plaza Hotel
Originally named the Queen's Park Plaza Hotel, the structure was designed by Hugh Gordon Holman. Construction began in 1928 and was due to be completed in 1929. However, the stock market crash and the beginning of the Great Depression caused its builder to go out of business. The steel framed structure was left partially completed for several years, as various attempts to restart it failed.

The hotel was finally completed as The Park Plaza Hotel and opened on July 11, 1936. The Park Plaza was expanded in 1956 with a second annex tower directly to the north, a modernist structure designed by Peter Dickinson.

Located across the street from the University of Toronto the hotel became known as a centre for Canadian literature, attracting authors, especially to the rooftop patio. As a result, the hotel has appeared in works by a number of Canadian writers including Margaret Atwood, Morley Callaghan, Mordecai Richler, and Hugh Garner. Near Queen's Park, it was also a popular site for many provincial government officials, with the Premier Bill Davis government's "Big Blue Machine" holding frequent meetings there.

In 1995, the hotel went into receivership, but was purchased by new owners who began a complete overhaul, adding such features as an almost  penthouse, to woo back the wealthiest guests.

Park Hyatt Toronto
In 1999 Hyatt purchased the hotel for $107 million, calculated to be the highest cost per room ever paid in Canada, and renamed it Park Hyatt Toronto. In 2014, Hyatt sold the hotel to Toronto-based Oxford Properties, for $90 million USD, with an encumbrance that the hotel remain operated as a Hyatt for at least 40 years.

Oxford closed the hotel on December 1, 2017, for an extensive renovation. The 1936 south tower was converted to 65 luxury rental units, marketed as Two Avenue Road, but still operated as part of the hotel complex. The 1956 north tower was completely renovated, to continue operating as a 219-room hotel. The two-story podium and vehicle forecourt that connected the towers was demolished and replaced by a new larger podium that makes up a streetwall. The hotel reopened on September 15, 2021.

See also
Hotels in Toronto
Four Seasons Hotel and Residences and Four Seasons Hotel Toronto
Shangri-La Toronto

References

External links
Park Hyatt Toronto official website
Two Avenue Road official website

Hotels in Toronto
Hotels established in 1936
Hotel buildings completed in 1936
Hotel buildings completed in 1956
Peter Dickinson (architect) buildings
Chicago school architecture in Canada